James Graves (1815 – 1886) was an Irish clergyman,  antiquary and archaeologist of the Victorian era.

Life 
A native of Kilkenny, James's father, Richard Graves (himself a priest), kept a school in the city, and James himself was born on St Canice's day, 11 October.  He stated his nurse, regretted he had not been named Kenny, after the patron saint to whom he thus had a double allegiance.  He went to Trinity College, Dublin in 1834, from where he graduated with a Bachelor of Arts (BA) in 1839.  Appointed curate to Skeirke in Co. Laois, he rapidly obtained preferment, and as curate of St Patrick's Kilkenny, was attached as Treasurer to St Canice's Cathedral, before gaining a living in the county.  Although married, he had no children.

His fame rests in his antiquarian and archaeological interests, rather than in his clerical pursuits. A close friend of John O'Donovan, he was also acquainted with George Petrie, and like them devoted his life towards the preservation of the antiquities of his native country.  His main point of interest however was the architecture of his own city and county, and his interests therefore were focussed not on the pre-Norman period of Irish history but on the period from circa 1169 onward.  In particular, he was responsible for the careful conservation work on St Canice's cathedral in Kilkenny city, while he was treasurer, and in the 1860s and 1870s he worked through the Royal Society of Antiquaries of Ireland, of which he was himself a founding member, towards the conservation of several important ruined medieval churches.

Although he is never accorded the degree of fame as a founding father of Irish archaeology which is given to Petrie, his effort towards the preservation of medieval Irish buildings was highly significant.  In particular, as a respectable Anglican clergyman, he was able to gain the ear of the establishment more easily than some of his Catholic contemporaries.  This proved of importance after the disestablishment of the Church of Ireland left many then ruinous church sites in an ambiguous position, which was rectified by their being taken into state care as National Monuments.

Bibliography

Further reading

Notes and references

Notes

Citations

Primary sources

1815 births
1886 deaths
Irish archaeologists
People from County Kilkenny
Members of Kilkenny Archaeological Society